Françoise Deslogères (born 9 May 1929 in Boulogne-Billancourt) is a French ondist.

Career 
She studied music (harmony, piano) with Henri Challan, Geneviève Joy and Jeanne Blancard. She began working on the ondes Martenot in 1957 with inventor Maurice Martenot. In 1968 she founded a trio for ondes Martenot, piano and percussions, the Trio Deslogères. Since 1971, she has been teaching the ondes Martenot in Boulogne-Billancourt and at the Université de Pau et des Pays de l'Adour

Premieres 
De Voci (1958), Pièces de chair (1967) by Sylvano Bussotti
Concerto (1966) by Raymond Depraz.
Points de rencontre (1977) by Charles Chaynes

Sources 
Alain Pâris: Dictionnaire des interprètes Bouquins/Laffont 1989 p. 320

External links 
 Portraits d'ondistes on federation-martenot.fr

1929 births
People from Boulogne-Billancourt
Living people
20th-century French women musicians
Ondists
21st-century French women musicians